Jean-Marie Hullot (February 16, 1954 – June 17, 2019) was a French computer scientist and programmer who authored important programs for the original Macintosh,  NeXTSTEP and Mac OS X platforms. These include the SOS Interface for the Mac, which later became Interface Builder for NeXTSTEP (1985), and later still evolved into an important part of Mac OS X. He also led the iCal and iSync development teams for Mac OS X (2002).

In 1981, Jean-Marie Hullot received a Ph.D. in computer science from the University of Paris at Orsay, where his adviser was Gérard Huet. He was a researcher at INRIA from 1979 to 1985, when he joined NeXT. In 1996 he co-founded RealNames, a URL translation service which closed in 2002. He worked as CTO of Application Division at Apple Inc. from 2001 to 2005. He was the President and CEO of Fotopedia, a collaborative photo encyclopedia, and co-founder of The Iris Foundation, a nature conservancy organization.

He died on June 19, 2019.

See also
Fotopedia

References

External links

 Jean-Marie Hullot - fotopedia
 INRIA  — appears to be outdated, as Hullot is not mentioned there (Jun 2014)
 Interview, December 1999 (in French)
 Ex-Apple Team To Launch Stealth Startup Fotonauts
 
 UPDATED: Google begged Steve Jobs for permission to hire engineers for its new Paris office. Guess what happened next…

1954 births
2019 deaths
Apple Inc. executives
French computer programmers
French computer scientists
NeXT
University of Paris alumni